2005 Hencke, provisional designation , is a stony Eunomia asteroid from the middle region of the asteroid belt, approximately 10 kilometers in diameter. It was discovered by Swiss astronomer Paul Wild at Zimmerwald Observatory near Bern, Switzerland, on 2 September 1973. The asteroid was named after German amateur astronomer Karl Ludwig Hencke.

Orbit and classification 

The asteroid is a member of the Eunomia family, a large group of S-type asteroids and the most prominent family in the intermediate main-belt. It orbits the Sun in the central main-belt at a distance of 2.2–3.1 AU once every 4 years and 3 months (1,550 days). Its orbit has an eccentricity of 0.17 and an inclination of 12° with respect to the ecliptic. As no precoveries were taken, the asteroid's observation arc begins with its discovery in 1973.

Physical characteristics

Rotation period 

In October 2007, a rotational lightcurve was obtained for this asteroid from photometric observations taken by U.S. astronomer James W. Brinsfield at the Via Capote Observatory in Thousand Oaks, California . The lightcurve gave a rotation period of  hours with a brightness amplitude of 0.08 in magnitude.

Diameter and albedo 

According to the survey carried out by the NEOWISE mission of NASA's Wide-field Infrared Survey Explorer, the asteroid measures 9.4 kilometers in diameter and its surface has an albedo of 0.27, while the Collaborative Asteroid Lightcurve Link assumes an albedo of 0.21, derived from the family's largest member and namesake, 15 Eunomia, and calculates a diameter of 10.5 kilometers.

Naming 

This minor planet was named in honor of German amateur astronomer Karl Ludwig Hencke (1793–1866), a postmaster by profession, who discovered the main-belt asteroids 5 Astraea and 6 Hebe in 1845 and 1847, respectively. The official  was published by the Minor Planet Center on 15 October 1977.

References

External links 
 Asteroid Lightcurve Database (LCDB), query form (info )
 Dictionary of Minor Planet Names, Google books
 Asteroids and comets rotation curves, CdR – Observatoire de Genève, Raoul Behrend
 Discovery Circumstances: Numbered Minor Planets (1)-(5000) – Minor Planet Center
 
 

002005
Hencke
Named minor planets
19730902